In linguistics, specificity is a semantic feature of noun phrases (NPs) that distinguishes between entities/nouns/referents that are unique in a given context and those that are not. Several distinct known factors determine an entity/noun/referent's relative specificity, including:
 Singular terms (e.g. proper names)
 Habituality
 Actual/Nonactual moods
 Factivity
 Negation

Specificity does not rely on existence. This is because specificity relies on the uniqueness of an entity, regardless of whether it may or may not actually exist. For example, “I’m looking for a male sister” refers to no actual entity. However, the ambiguity of its specificity (are you looking for a particular male sister, or any male sister?) is retained.

Ambiguity in Languages with Unmarked Specificity 
In English and many other languages, specificity is not typically marked. As a result, sometimes, specificity can be ambiguous. Consider the following example:
 Every woman talked to a student.

This has two interpretations. Under one reading, every woman talked to the same student (the class president, for example), and here the noun phrase a student is specific. Under the second reading, various students were talked to. In this case, a student is non-specific.

"In contrast, in some languages, NPs in certain positions are always unambiguous with respect to specificity. The ambiguity is resolved through case marking: NPs with overt case morphology are specific, NPs without case morphology are nonspecific."
Some analytic and isolating languages like Samoan also use explicit specificity markings in nouns despite not having grammatical cases.

Relationship Between Specificity and Definiteness 
Specificity and definiteness, while closely linked, are distinct semantic features. The two main nominal codings of definiteness are definite and indefinite. The former leads predominantly to a specific noun phrase. The latter can be either specific or non-specific.

I'm looking for the manager, Ms Lee. [definite, specific]
I'm looking for the manager, whoever that may be. [definite, non-specific]
There's a certain word that I can never remember. [indefinite, specific]
Think of a word, any word. [indefinite, non-specific]

Note that to make the second example definite and non-specific requires a clarifying extra clause.

References 

Semantics
Formal semantics (natural language)